Cingestol (INN, USAN) (former tentative brand name Lutisan), also known as 17α-ethynylestr-5-en-17β-ol, is a steroidal progestin of the 19-nortestosterone group that was never marketed. It was synthesized in 1969 and was developed in the 1970s by Organon as a low-dose, progestogen-only contraceptive, but in 1984, was still described as "under investigation". The drug is an isomer of lynestrenol with the double bond between C5 and C6.

See also
 Allylestrenol

References

Estranes
Progestogens